Pseudaletis zebra, the zebra fantasy, is a butterfly in the family Lycaenidae. It is found in Sierra Leone, Liberia, Ivory Coast, Ghana, Nigeria, Cameroon, Gabon, the Central African Republic and the Democratic Republic of the Congo. The habitat consists of forests.

Subspecies
Pseudaletis zebra zebra (Nigeria: west and the Cross River loop, Cameroon, Gabon, Central African Republic, Democratic Republic of the Congo)
Pseudaletis zebra subangulata Talbot, 1935 (Sierra Leone, Liberia, Ivory Coast, Ghana)

References

Butterflies described in 1891
Pseudaletis
Butterflies of Africa